Eldora is the name of several places in the United States:

 Eldora, Colorado
 Eldora Mountain Resort
 Eldora, Florida
 Eldora, Iowa
 Eldora, New Jersey
 Eldora, Pennsylvania
 Eldora Speedway, auto racing track near New Weston, Ohio

Ships
 Eldora (ship, 1904), a windjammer, see Placilla (ship)
 Eldora (ship, 1937), see Boats of the Mackenzie River watershed